Biola may refer to:

Places
Biola University, a university in Los Angeles County, California
Biola, California, a small town in Fresno County
Biola (island), an island in Singapore

People
Biola Alabi, Nigerian businesswoman

Business and Economy
Biola (brand), a Ukrainian producer of juices and soft drinks